Josefa González Blanco Ortiz Mena (born 9 March 1965) is a Mexican ecologist, politician and diplomat from the National Regeneration Movement who was the Secretary of Environment from 2018 to 2019. She currently serves as the Mexican ambassador to the United Kingdom since 23 April 2021. On 9 June 2021, she presented her credentials to Queen Elizabeth II at Buckingham Palace accrediting her as Mexico's representative to the United Kingdom.

Early life and education 
She was born in Mexico City. She attended Anáhuac University where she studied Law and graduated with a degree in law in 1989. In 2014, she graduated from the John F. Kennedy University with a Master's in Transformative Art.

Career 
She was Secretary of Environment and Natural Resources of the Government of Mexico between 2018 and 2019, leading the national policy on natural resources and environmental regulation. She was Administrative Secretary of the Postgraduate Program of the Faculty of Law of the National Autonomous University of Mexico and promoter of various social, cultural and environmental programs and projects.

Secretary of Environment and Natural Resources 
From 2017 to 2018, she was coordinator of the strategic agenda of Morena. In 2018, she assumed the title of the Secretariat as the first Secretary of the Environment and Natural Resources of the current administration, becoming the second woman to hold the position in the history of the federal agency. On May 25, 2019, she resigned from her office as Minister of Environment after causing delay to a commercial flight she was meant to board.

Ambassador to United Kingdom 
In March 2021, she was appointed Ambassador to United Kingdom by the Senate of the Republic (Mexico). On April 23, 2021, she officially assumed her duties as representative of Mexico in London, after presenting a copy of her Credentials that accredit her as Ambassador of Mexico to the United Kingdom of Great Britain and Northern Ireland to the Ministry of Foreign Affairs, the Commonwealth and Development International.

References 

Living people
1965 births
Cabinet of Andrés Manuel López Obrador
Women Secretaries of State of Mexico
21st-century Mexican politicians
21st-century Mexican women politicians
Mexican ecologists
Politicians from Mexico City
Morena (political party) politicians
Mexican Secretaries of the Environment
Ambassadors of Mexico to the United Kingdom